The Maine State Nurses Association is a professional organization and trade union of registered nurses in the U.S. state of Maine. It is an affiliate of National Nurses United. It was incorporated on December 10, 1914. Superintendent of the Children's Hospital in Portland, Edith Soule, was its first president. One of its first acts was to support a bill for the registration and professionalization of nurses, which passed the Maine Legislature in 1915. It was initially affiliated with the American Nurses Association. It formed its first collective bargaining unit at Eastern Maine Medical Center in the 1970s.

References

External links
 Official site

National Nurses United
AFL–CIO
Trade unions in Maine
1914 establishments in Maine
Healthcare reform advocacy groups in the United States
State wide trade unions in the United States
Trade unions established in 1914
Medical and health organizations based in Maine